Taizhou Airport may refer to:

Taizhou Luqiao Airport, serving Taizhou in Zhejiang, China
Yangzhou Taizhou International Airport, serving Yangzhou and Taizhou in Jiangsu, China